Yevgeni Sergeyevich Dudikov (born 11 March 1987) is a Russian former professional football player.

Club career
He made his Russian Football National League debut for FC Sakhalin Yuzhno-Sakhalinsk on 6 July 2014 in a game against FC Anzhi Makhachkala.

External links
 
 

1987 births
Sportspeople from Saratov
Living people
Russian footballers
Association football defenders
FC Sokol Saratov players
FC Sakhalin Yuzhno-Sakhalinsk players
FC Tekstilshchik Ivanovo players
FC Baikal Irkutsk players
FC Akron Tolyatti players